The Punisher: The Ultimate Payback!, released in 1991 by Acclaim Entertainment, is the Game Boy version of the 1990 NES game The Punisher. It follows the Marvel Comics vigilante Frank Castle, also known as the Punisher. Updates after the NES version include cameo appearances of Spider-Man and the final boss was switched from Kingpin to Jigsaw.

Plot 
As in the NES version, the Punisher's origin has been slightly altered from that of the comic books, so he is a former police detective instead of a US Marine. The game follows Frank Castle after the death of his wife and children at the hands of the mafia, and he became a vigilante who hunts and kills every criminal he believes deserves it.

The game begins with Spider-Man telling Punisher that a drug lord is hiding in a mall and that he has to get him. Frank Castle shoots villains while protecting the innocent. Spider-Man appears between the action to offer advice on how to beat upcoming levels and swings in to rescue hostages once their captors have been shot.

At the end of the game when Jigsaw realizes that The Punisher is going to kill him, Castle says, "Penance is good for the soul, but punishment is good for the guilty".

Gameplay 
The player controls Frank Castle (the Punisher) from an over-the-shoulder third-persmusic on perspective through various New York City locations, shooting thugs and battling enemies such as Hitman, Colonel Kliegg, Sijo Kanaka, and Assassin as bosses. The final boss is Jigsaw. Power-ups can be obtained by shooting them onscreen and include extra ammunition, a med kit, kevlar, a machine gun, a bazooka, and grenades.

Reception 
Blair Farrell of Comic Gamers Assemble criticized the game for removing the player's ability to move the Punisher across the screen but understood it was due to the size of the screen. He stated that the game is relatively short and difficult, and that Spider-Man's appearances did not make sense for the character considering that he would never aid the Punisher in killing his enemies. He said the game is overall very inferior to the NES version but has the advantage of separate soundtracks for each level.

Other reviewers have criticized the game for having very light player assistance and few health drops but that it is still relatively entertaining. Others commented on straying from the source comics.

Russ Waddle of GameFAQs stated that it is incorrect to characterize a portable game like this based on the home console counterpart and that the game is an "on rails shooter with crosshairs". He said the publishers did a great job translating the game to handheld. He said it lacks maneuverability but that it was understandable due to the limitations of the platform. He said it is short but that he liked the graphics, which were fairly impressive for the Game Boy and that the villain Jigsaw was very well rendered. He agreed with the decision to change the villain from the previous game. He said the sound was excellent for the Game Boy and that the soundtrack was above that of the NES version, comparing it to Final Fantasy Legend and Link's Awakening. Overall he believed the game would be great for anyone who is a fan of the character and gave it an eight out of ten score.

See also 
 Marvel Games

References 

1991 video games
Acclaim Entertainment games
Game Boy games
Game Boy-only games
North America-exclusive video games
Single-player video games
Video games based on Punisher
Video games developed in Australia
Video games set in New York City